The Battle of Kimbaramba was fought in German East Africa (now Tanzania), in 1916, during the East African Campaign of World War I.

References

Battles of the East African Campaign
1916 in German East Africa